Secrets of the Vatican is an American television documentary film. It was first aired on the PBS Channel on 25 February 2014 as an episode of PBS' Frontline TV series.

The film covers the period after the death of John Paul II until the first year of Pope Francis, and it posits a theory of what made Pope Benedict XVI resign from the papacy in 2013. It presents a return of trust in the Vatican and its new Pope, Francis, by millions of Roman Catholics after a long period of controversy regarding sexual abuse by Church authorities. It delves into reports of the existence of a "gay mafia" inside the Church and highlights the scandal involving the Legionnaires of Christ founder Marcial Maciel, who allegedly had the backing of John Paul II.

The film also tackles the papacy's struggles with cleaning up the Vatican Bank of its corrupt financial policies as an international institution by starting with Benedict XVI's hindered investigations and ending in Francis' supposedly radical initial reforms.

The film approaches the controversial topics of the documentary not from perspectives outside of the Church but with testimonies by devoted Catholics: sexual abuse victims, corruption witnesses and priest investigators.

Written, directed, and produced by Antony Thomas for the US Public Broadcasting System TV series Frontline, Secrets of the Vatican was co-produced by Jason Berry in the United States and Helen Fitzwilliam in Rome.

Cast 
In order of appearance:

 Cardinal Cormac Murphy-O'Connor, Archbishop Emeritus of Westminster
 Pope Francis
 Robert Mickens, Vatican correspondent for The Tablet
 Pope Benedict XVI
 Carmelo Abbate, investigative journalist and author of Sex and the Vatican
 members of the Legionnaires of Christ
 Rev. Marcial Maciel Degollado, founder of the Legionnaires of Christ and revealed to have sexually abused boys
 Jason Berry, author of Render Unto Rome and Frontline consultant
 Fr. Juan Vaca, clergy sexual abuse survivor
 Pope John Paul II
 Raul Gonzales, one of Maciel's alleged sons
 Marco Politi, La Repubblica journalist and author of Crisis of a Papacy
 Fr. Thomas Doyle, former secretary and canon lawyer at the Vatican embassy in Washington, D.C., turned campaigner against sexual abuse in the Church and against clericalism
 Milwaukee clergy sexual abuse victims
 Fr. James Connell of Milwaukee
 Monica Barrett, Milwaukee clergy sexual assault and rape victim
 Fr. William Effinger (black and white still photo), Barrett's rapist
 Jeff Anderson, Milwaukee plaintiffs' attorney
 Peter Isley, Milwaukee clergy sexual abuse survivor
 Fr. Gayle Leifeld, confessed sexual abuser
 members of the Milwaukee Survivors Network of those Abused by Priests (SNAP)
 Bishop Richard J. Sklba, auxiliary bishop of the Roman Catholic Diocese of Milwaukee
 Martin Kafka, psychiatrist from the Harvard Medical School invited to the Vatican
 Seminarians at the American seminary in Rome
 Fr. Simone Alfieri, newly-ordained priest who soon left the priesthood
 Francesco Cacace, gay former seminarian
 Cardinal Tarcisio Bertone, appointed by Pope Benedict XVI to be Cardinal Secretary of State
 Members of the Roman Curia
 Nello Rossi, Chief Prosecutor of Rome
 Ettore Gotti Tedeschi, appointed by Pope Benedict XVI to become President of the Vatican Bank to start reforms in the bank, but who was soon expelled by Bertone
 Gianluigi Nuzzi, Milan-television journalist and author of Vatican Ltd.
 Franca Giansoldati, Vatican correspondent of il Messaggero
 Paolo Gabriele
 Msgr. Carlo Maria Viganò (still photo), who, after his 2009 appointment as Secretary General of the Vatican City Governatorate, told Pope Benedict XVI of the extent of the systemic corruption in the Vatican, but was soon transferred by the Pope to the Vatican embassy in the US
 Cardinal Julián Herranz Casado, appointed to head an investigation of the "Vatileaks"
 Barbie Nadeau of CNN and The Daily Beast
 Philip Pullella, Vatican correspondent of Reuters
 Ignazio Ingrao, investigative journalist and author of The Second Secret
 Cardinal Óscar Andrés Rodríguez Maradiaga, archbishop of Tegucigalpa
 members of the new Pope Francis-appointed Council of Cardinal Advisers
 Eugenio Scalfari, renowned atheist
 Fabrizio Mastrofini, editor of Vatican Radio
 Msgr. Nunzio Scarano (blurred out), arrested Vatican Bank officer
 Sandro Magister, Vatican correspondent of L'Espresso

See also 
 Vatican leaks scandal

References

External links
 On Secrets of the Vatican at PBS.org
 Full-movie streaming video of Secrets of the Vatican at PBS.org
 

2014 documentary films
2014 television specials
American documentary films
Documentary films about child abuse
Documentary films about Christianity in the United States
Documentary films about crime in the United States
Documentary films about pedophilia
Documentary films about Catholicism
2010s English-language films
Films about rape
Media coverage of Catholic Church sexual abuse scandals
Catholic Church sexual abuse scandals in the United States
Frontline (American TV program)